Freedom is the third studio album by Australian band, Yothu Yindi released in 1993. The album peaked at number 31 on the ARIA charts.

At the ARIA Music Awards of 1994, the album was nominated for ARIA Award for Best Indigenous Release.

Track listing
"Timeless Land" (Mandawuy Yunupingu, Witiyana Marika, Stuart Kellaway, D. Bridie)
"World of Innocence" (M. Yunupingu, Kellaway, Ian Faith)
"Freedom" (M. Yunupingu)
"Baywara" (M. Yunupingu, Kellaway)
"Ngerrk" (Traditional song, arranged by Galarrwuy Yunupingu)
"Back to Culture" (M. Yunupingu, Kellaway, Ian Faith)
"World Turning" (M. Yunupingu, W. Marika, Ian Faith)
"Mabo" (M. Yunupingu, Galarrwuy Yunupingu, Kellaway, Gurrumul Yunupingu)
"Milika" (Traditional song, arranged by W. Marika)
"Danggultji" (Traditional song, arranged by W. Marika, B. Marika)
"Gunitjpirr Man" (M. Yunupingu)
"Yolngu Boy" (M. Yunupingu)
"Dots on the Shells" (M. Yunupingu, Neil Finn)
"Our Generation" (M. Yunupingu, Kellaway, A. Farris)
"Gany'tjurr" (Traditional song, arranged by Galarrwuy Yunupingu)
"Gapu" (Tidal Mix) (Traditional song, arranged by Galarrwuy Yunupingu)

Personnel
 Mandawuy Yunupingu – vocals, guitar
 Witiyana Marika – vocals, clapsticks, dance
 Makuma Yunupingu – didgeridoo, vocals, clapsticks
 Stuart Kellaway – bass guitar
 Mangatjay Yunupingu – dance
 Banula Marika – vocals, dance
 Bunimbirr Marika – didgeridoo
 Cal Williams – guitar
 Natalie Gillespie – vocals
 Galarrwuy Yunupingu – vocals, clapsticks
 Milkayngu Mununggurr – didgeridoo
 Gurrumul Yunupingu – guitar, vocals, keyboards
 Jodie Cockatoo – vocals
 Ian Faith – guitars
 Mark Ovenden – keys, programming
 Bill Laswell – bass
 Nicky Skopelitis – 6 and 12-string guitar
 Bernie Worrell – organ
 Terepai Richmond – drums
 Daniel Watson – percussion
 Allen Murphy – drums
 Andrew Belletty – drums

Charts

Release history

References

Yothu Yindi albums
Mushroom Records albums
1993 albums